David Zurutuza Veillet (born 19 July 1986) is a Spanish former footballer who played as a central midfielder. 

He spent his entire professional career contracted to Real Sociedad, with whom he made 303 competitive appearances across over a decade, and was also loaned to Eibar in the Segunda División.

Early years
Zurutuza was born in Rochefort, Charente-Maritime, France, to a French mother and a Spanish father; the family returned to the latter's native Basque Country shortly after. He also held French citizenship.

Club career
Zurutuza joined Real Sociedad's youth system after starting his football career in Deba, Gipuzkoa. In the 2007–08 season, he was loaned to neighbours SD Eibar of Segunda División.

Zurutuza spent the following campaign with Real's B team in the Segunda División B, suffering relegation. On 23 November 2008 he made his debut for the main squad, playing ten minutes as a substitute for Necati Ateş in a 1–0 home win against SD Huesca.

In 2009–10, Zurutuza contributed four goals in 28 games as Real Sociedad returned to La Liga after a three-year absence. He continued to be first choice the next season, making his debut in the competition on 29 August 2010 in the 1–0 home victory over Villarreal CF and scoring his first goal on 28 November in a 3–1 away defeat of Sporting de Gijón; he only missed two league matches as the club managed to retain its status.

On 31 August 2014, in the second matchday of the new season, Zurutuza put on a Player of the match performance at home against Real Madrid, his brace helping Real Sociedad come from 0–2 behind to win the game 4–2. Five years later, on 14 September, he made his 300th appearance against Atlético Madrid.

Zurutuza retired from football in July 2020, at the age of 34.

Career statistics

Club

Honours
Real Sociedad
Segunda División: 2009–10

References

External links
Real Sociedad official profile

1986 births
Living people
People from Rochefort, Charente-Maritime
People from Hendaye
French people of Spanish descent
French people of Basque descent
Spanish people of French descent
People with acquired French citizenship
Sportspeople from Charente-Maritime
Sportspeople from Gipuzkoa
Spanish footballers
Footballers from the Basque Country (autonomous community)
Footballers from Nouvelle-Aquitaine
Association football midfielders
La Liga players
Segunda División players
Segunda División B players
Real Sociedad B footballers
Real Sociedad footballers
SD Eibar footballers
Basque Country international footballers